Robert Marie Gay (22 January 1927 – 29 June 2016) was a Canadian-born Ugandan Roman Catholic prelate. He was the second bishop of the Roman Catholic Diocese of Kabale from 1996 to 2003.

Background and priesthood
Gay was born in Ottawa, Ontario on 22 January 1927. He joined the missionary congregation of the Missionaries of Africa and on 30 January 1954 was ordained as priest. He served as Superior General of  Missionaries of Africa (White Fathers), from 1980 until 1986.

As bishop
Gay was appointed as bishop by the Pope John Paul II on 11 January 1996. He was consecrated to the Episcopate on 9 March 1996. The principal consecrator was Cardinal Emmanuel Wamala, Archbishop of the Archdiocese of Kampala, assisted by Bishop Barnabas Rugwizangonga Halem ’Imana, Bishop Emeritus of Kabale and Bishop Paul Kamuza Bakyenga, Bishop of Mbarara. Bisop Gay retired on 15 March 2003.

Sickness and death
Gay died on 29 June 2016 at Passages Hospice, in Sherbrooke, Quebec, Canada, at the age of 89 years.

See also
 Uganda Martyrs
 Roman Catholicism in Uganda

References

External links
 Profile of the Roman Catholic Diocese of Kabale

1927 births
2016 deaths
Canadian emigrants to Uganda
20th-century Canadian Roman Catholic priests
Clergy from Ottawa
20th-century Roman Catholic bishops in Uganda
21st-century Roman Catholic bishops in Uganda
Roman Catholic bishops of Kabale